Ayanna Thompson is Regents Professor of English at Arizona State University and Director of the Arizona Center for Medieval & Renaissance Studies (ACMRS). She was the 2018–19 president of the Shakespeare Association of America. She specializes in Renaissance drama and issues of race in performance.

Education 
Thompson graduated with an A.B. from Columbia University in 1994, where she was a Kluge scholar, and was mentored by Edward Said. She won a Marshall Scholarship to study at the University of Sussex, receiving a Masters in 1995. She received her PhD from Harvard University in 2001. Her doctoral dissertation was Depicting Race and Torture on the Early Modern Stage.

Career 
Thompson was previously an investment banker at Lehman Brothers. Thompson was Professor at Arizona State University 2004-2013 before her appointment at George Washington University. Thompson served as a Phi Beta Kappa Visiting Scholar, 2017-2018. She was previously President of the Shakespeare Association of America (2018–19).

She currently serves on the boards of the journals Shakespeare Quarterly, Renaissance Drama, and Shakespeare Bulletin. She has served as a member of the Board of Directors for the Association of Marshall Scholars. In 2021 she was elected to the American Academy of Arts and Sciences. Thompson is an Associate Scholar and the Chair of the Royal Shakespeare Company's Research Board, and is a member of the Folger Shakespeare Library Board of Governors.

Thompson gave the keynote speech on "Shakespeare and Blackface" at the Shakespeare and Social Justice conference held at the University of Cape Town in association with the University of the Witwatersrand and the Shakespeare Association of Southern Africa in 2019.

As Director of the Arizona Center for Medieval and Renaissance Studies, Thompson is the creator of RaceB4Race, an ongoing conference series and professional network community by and for scholars of color.

Ayanna Thompson serves as a consultant and dramaturg for many theater companies and is a Shakespeare Scholar in Residence at The Public Theater in New York. She is a text consultant for Sam Gold's 2022 production of Macbeth on Broadway starring Daniel Craig and Ruth Negga. She is also a dramaturg for the 2022 musical Suffs written by Shaina Taub.

Thompson has been described as 'a world-class scholar', an 'accomplished leader', a 'true innovator', and 'a major force'.

Bibliography 
 Blackface – Object Lessons (Bloomsbury 2021)
 (ed.) The Cambridge Companion to Shakespeare and Race (Cambridge: Cambridge University Press 2021)
 Shakespeare in the Theatre: Peter Sellars (London: The Arden Shakespeare, 2018)
 Shakespeare, Race and Performance: The Diverse Bard, ed. by Delia Jarrett-Macauley (Abingdon: Routledge, 2017)
 (ed.) Colorblind Shakespeare: New Perspectives on Race and Performance (London: Routledge, 2016)
 (Co-authored with Laura Turchi) Teaching Shakespeare With Purpose: A Student-Centred Approach (London: Bloomsbury Arden Shakespeare, 2016)
 Introduction to Othello, edited by E. A. J. Honigmann (London: Arden Shakespeare, 2016)
 Passing Strange: Shakespeare, Race, And Contemporary America (Oxford: Oxford University Press, 2011)
 (ed.) Weyward Macbeth: Intersections of Race and Performance (London: Palgrave, 2010)
 Performing Race and Torture on the Early Modern Stage (New York: Routledge, 2008)

References

External links 
 Arizona State University Staff Profile Page: Ayanna Thompson
 Interview with Professor Thompson: Alumnae Explore Race, Revenge in Shakespeare | Columbia College Today
 Interview with Professor Thompson: The Othello whisperer
 Ayanna Thompson's personal website: Ayanna Thompson
 

Arizona State University faculty
Harvard University alumni
American investment bankers
Living people
21st-century American educators
Alumni of the University of Sussex
Year of birth missing (living people)
Columbia College (New York) alumni